Fletcher Cox (born December 13, 1990) is an American football defensive tackle for the Philadelphia Eagles of the National Football League (NFL). He played college football at Mississippi State, and was drafted by the Eagles in the first round of the 2012 NFL Draft. Cox is a Super Bowl champion and has been selected to the Pro Bowl six times.

College career
Cox attended Yazoo City High School in Yazoo City, Mississippi, where he played football and basketball and ran track. Cox played three seasons at Mississippi State University. In football, Cox was named an All-American by Pro Football Weekly as a junior in 2011, after totalling 103 total tackles, including 11 quarterback sacks and two interceptions, one of which he returned for a touchdown. As a senior, he had 104 total tackles, including 10 quarterback sacks, and also added one interception and a fumble recovery. He was selected to play in the Mississippi-Alabama High School All-Star game.

He was also on the Yazoo High track & field team, where he competed in the high jump and in the relays. At the 2009 Division 3-4A Meet, he placed 8th in the high jump event, with a leap of 1.74 meters. In relays, he had personal-best times of 44.32 seconds in the 4 × 100m relay and 1:32.63 minutes in the 4 × 200m relay. He was also credited with a 4.47 time in the 40-yard dash, and benched 300 lb.

Regarded as a four-star recruit by national recruiting web site Rivals.com, he was rated as the No. 5 weak side defensive end in the country, and the No. 2 prospect in the state of Mississippi. He was also considered the No. 17 defensive end prospect in the country by Scout.com. He chose to attend MSU over scholarship offers from LSU, Alabama, Auburn and Ole Miss.

Professional career

2012 season
The Philadelphia Eagles traded up from the 15th selection to pick Cox 12th overall in the first round of the 2012 NFL Draft. He is the highest selected Mississippi State Bulldog since Michael Haddix in 1983, and the highest selected Bulldog defensive lineman since Jimmy Webb in 1975. Cox was signed to a four-year contract on June 18, 2012.

On October 14, 2012, Cox was ejected after throwing punches against Detroit Lions players, and was fined $21,000. During his rookie year in 2012, Cox played 15 games and finished with 39 tackles, 5.5 sacks, 4 passes defended, and 1 forced fumble.

2013 season
With the Eagles switching to a 3-4 type defense in 2013, Cox played defensive end. In 2013, Cox started all 16 games and finished with 44 tackles, three sacks, three passes defended, and one fumble recovery. The Eagles finished the season with a 10-6 record to clinch the NFC East, but lost to the New Orleans Saints in the wild card round by a score of 26-24.

2014 season
The 2014 season was a breakout year for Cox, acquiring 61 tackles, 4.0 sacks, one forced fumble, three fumble recoveries, and five run stuffs in 16 games. His presence along the Eagles defensive line led to league-wide recognition and Second-team All-Pro honors.

2015 season
On April 27, 2015, the Eagles picked up his 5th year option, keeping him with the team through the 2016 season. In a matchup against the New Orleans Saints in week 5 of the 2015 season, Cox recorded 3.0 sacks and 2 forced fumbles. These matched his season total from 2014 in sacks (4.0) and his career total from 2012-2014 in forced fumbles (2) within only 5 games.

Cox finished the 2015 season with 71 tackles, 9.5 sacks, two passes defended, and three forced fumbles. For his efforts, Cox received Second-team All-Pro honors and was selected to the Pro Bowl for the first time in his career. He also received the Ed Block Courage Award. He was ranked 49th on the NFL Top 100 Players of 2016.

2016 season
In 2016, the Eagles reverted to a 4-3 scheme, leading to Cox switching back to defensive tackle. On June 13, 2016, Cox signed a six-year, $103 million extension with the Eagles with $63 million guaranteed. As a result of a successful 2016 season, Cox was named to his second consecutive Pro Bowl. He was also ranked 38th by his peers on the NFL Top 100 Players of 2017.

2017 season

On September 10, 2017, in the season opening 30–17 victory over the Washington Redskins, Cox recovered a fumble from quarterback Kirk Cousins and returned it for a touchdown late in the fourth quarter to help put the game away.  On December 19, 2017, Cox was named to his third straight Pro Bowl. Cox could not play in the Pro Bowl because of his team advancing to the Super Bowl. The Eagles defeated the New England Patriots in Super Bowl LII 41-33 to give Cox his first Super Bowl ring. Cox recorded one tackle. He was ranked 69th by his peers on the NFL Top 100 Players of 2018.

2018 season
In Week 17, Cox recorded three sacks, four tackles for loss, and a forced fumble in a 24-0 win over the Washington Redskins, earning him NFC Defensive Player of the Week. In addition to being named to his 4th Pro Bowl, he was selected as a 1st Team All-Pro for the first time in his career. He was ranked 28th by his peers on the NFL Top 100 Players of 2019.

2019 season
In week 7 against the Dallas Cowboys, Cox recorded his first sack and forced fumble of the season on Dak Prescott in the 37–10 loss.
In week 8 against the Buffalo Bills, Cox recorded 1.5 sacks on Josh Allen in the 31-13 win. He was named to his 5th Pro Bowl and was ranked 73rd by his peers on the NFL Top 100 Players of 2020. Following the season, Cox was selected as one of the four defensive tackles on the National Football League 2010s All-Decade Team.

2020 season
During the 2020 season, Cox registered 6.5 sacks and 41 tackles to go along with a forced fumble. With the Eagles already eliminated from the playoffs, he was inactive in week 17 against Washington.
Cox was named to the Pro Bowl for the sixth time in his career and was ranked 63rd by fellow players in the NFL Top 100 Players of 2021.

2021 season
In week 15, Cox recorded two sacks and four QB hits against the NFC East rival Washington Football Team. On January 3, 2022, Cox was placed on the COVID list. He was activated one week later on January 10, missing just one game where the Eagles did not play their starters.

2022 season
On March 17, 2022, Cox was released by the Eagles at the start of the new league year, but was re-signed two days later on a one-year contract. Cox and the Eagles reached Super Bowl LVII, Cox’s second Super Bowl. Cox had one tackle in the game, which the Eagles lost 38-35 to the Kansas City Chiefs.

2023 season 
On March 16, 2023, Cox re-signed with the Eagles on a one-year, $10 million contract.

NFL career statistics

Awards
 NFC Defensive Player of the Month for September 2016
NFC Defensive Player of Week 17 2019

Personal life
Cox is the cousin of fellow Eagles player Kenneth Gainwell.

References

External links
Philadelphia Eagles bio
Mississippi State Bulldogs bio

1990 births
Living people
American football defensive tackles
American football defensive ends
Mississippi State Bulldogs football players
Philadelphia Eagles players
People from Yazoo City, Mississippi
Players of American football from Mississippi
Unconferenced Pro Bowl players
National Conference Pro Bowl players
Ed Block Courage Award recipients